The Wales national rugby sevens team competes in the World Rugby Sevens Series, the Rugby World Cup Sevens and in the Commonwealth Games.

Wales were the World Cup Sevens Champions after winning the 2009 Rugby World Cup Sevens in the United Arab Emirates. But they relinquished that title after failing to defend their crown at the 2013 Rugby World Cup Sevens in Moscow.

The Welsh sevens squad was disbanded by the Welsh Rugby Union due to financial constraints. After a three-year absence, the Wales sevens team returned to international competition in the 2006–07 season. They competed at half of the eight tournaments and won the plate competition (fifth place) at each of them. They repeated this feat at the 2006 Commonwealth Games.

The star of the 2005–06 squad was Neath RFC and Ospreys player James Hook. Hook later progressed to the Wales national 15-a-side team. In 2006–07, Wales competed in the Dubai, South Africa, Australia, Hong Kong, Scotland and England legs of the IRB's World Sevens Series, reaching the semi-finals of the cup at Twickenham and Murrayfield. Wales have been a core team that has competed in all legs of the IRB Sevens Series since the 2007–08 season.

At the 2016 USA Sevens, Wales beat Canada, Portugal, Scotland and France to win the Bowl final and claim 9th place.

Tournament history

Rugby World Cup Sevens

Commonwealth Games

2009 Rugby World Cup Sevens

In Wales's first ever cup final appearance in a major rugby sevens event, Wales played Argentina in the 2009 World Cup Final.

In the Group stages Wales beat Zimbabwe 31–5 and Uruguay 27–0 before losing to Argentina 14–0 in the final pool match, leaving Wales uncertain of a cup quarterfinals spot. With results going their way Wales made it to the cup quarterfinals as one of the second place qualifiers for the first time in their history.

Wales beat favourites New Zealand in the quarterfinals 15–14, and defeated Samoa in the semifinals 19–12.

Wales faced Argentina for the second time in the tournament in the Final. Wales started with the same team that played against New Zealand and Samoa earlier in the day. At half time Wales had a lead of 12–7 after tries from Richie Pugh and Tal Selley.
In the second half Argentina levelled the score at 12–12. With less than 90 seconds left, Wales's Aled Thomas scored underneath the posts and with a successful conversion put Wales into the lead at 19–12.
Argentina claimed the restart. After the siren sounded to indicate there was no time left on the clock Argentina fumbled the ball in a ruck leading to the ball being kicked out of play and Wales being crowned the 2009 Sevens Rugby World Cup Champions.

2009 World Cup winning squad
The 12-man squad, coached by Paul John of Pontypridd, for the 2009 Rugby World Cup Sevens.

World Rugby Sevens Series record

Team

Current squad

Notable former players

  Lee Byrne
  Taliesin Selley
  Jason Forster
  James Hook
  Rhys Oakley
  Robin Sowden-Taylor
  Josh Turnbull
  Andy Powell
  Wayne Proctor
  Alex Cuthbert
  David Evans
  Richie Pugh
  James Davies

Notable former coaches
  Dai Rees
  Colin Hillman
  Gareth Baber

References

National rugby sevens teams
Seven